Gool may refer to:

 Gool (game), a terms used in some variations of the game "tag"
 Gool, Jammu and Kashmir, a community in Ramban district
 Gool Nasikwala, Indian female table tennis player
 Zainunnisa Gool (1897–1963), South African political and civil rights leader
 Game Object Oriented Lisp (GOOL), a Lisp dialect designed by Andy Gavin

See also 

 Van Gool, a Dutch surname (includes a list of people with the name)
 Ghoul (disambiguation)
 Goole (disambiguation)